Richard Albert Van Arsdale (born February 22, 1943) is an American former professional basketball player and coach, and a current National Basketball Association (NBA) executive.

A graduate of Emmerich Manual High School in Indianapolis, Van Arsdale played collegiately at Indiana University under longtime head coach Branch McCracken. He was selected by the New York Knicks in the second round of the 1965 NBA draft, and was named to the NBA All-Rookie Team in 1966, together with his identical twin brother Tom.

Van Arsdale played in the NBA for twelve seasons; three with the Knicks and the remainder with the Phoenix Suns (their first selection in the 1968 expansion draft). Van Arsdale, a three-time All-Star, was consistently one of the best free throw shooters in professional basketball. He retired from the NBA in 1977 and is remembered in Phoenix basketball lore as the "original Sun".

Van Arsdale later became the Suns' general manager; he is currently the team's senior vice president of player personnel. Following the firing of John MacLeod in February 1987, he was the interim head coach for that season's final 26 games.

He is the identical twin brother of Tom Van Arsdale. The twins played together through college and again in Phoenix during the 1976–77 season, the final for both.

References

External links

 Basketball-Reference.com: Dick Van Arsdale (as coach)
 Phoenix Suns History: Dick Van Arsdale

1943 births
Living people
All-American college men's basketball players
American men's basketball coaches
American men's basketball players
Basketball coaches from Indiana
Basketball players from Indianapolis
Identical twins
Indiana Hoosiers men's basketball players
National Basketball Association All-Stars
National Basketball Association executives
National Basketball Association players with retired numbers
New York Knicks draft picks
New York Knicks players
Parade High School All-Americans (boys' basketball)
Phoenix Suns announcers
Phoenix Suns expansion draft picks
Phoenix Suns head coaches
Phoenix Suns players
Shooting guards
Small forwards
American twins
Twin sportspeople